Barry K. Lawrence (born 13 February 1946) is a former Australian rules footballer who played for St Kilda in the Victorian Football League (VFL) and for Longford in the Northern Tasmanian Football Association (NTFA).

Barry played as a forward for Longford in Tasmania and signed to play with Hawthorn in 1967 but he decided to stay in Tasmania for two more years.

He was selected as a back pocket in the St Kilda Team of the Century and on the half back flank in the Tasmanian Team of the Century.

Later he returned to the forward line.

He is the father of former St Kilda and Brisbane player Steven Lawrence.

References

External links
Saints Player Encyclopedia
Hall of Fame biography at Saints.com.au

1947 births
Living people
Australian rules footballers from Tasmania
St Kilda Football Club players
Longford Football Club players
Tasmanian Football Hall of Fame inductees